Waxcap grassland is short-sward, nutrient-poor grassland that supports a rich assemblage of larger fungi, particularly waxcaps (species of Hygrocybe and related genera), characteristic of such habitats.  Waxcap grasslands occur principally in Europe, where they are declining as a result of agricultural practices. The fungal species are consequently of conservation concern and efforts have been made in the United Kingdom and elsewhere to protect both the grasslands and their characteristic fungi. Over 20 species of European waxcap grassland fungi are assessed as globally "vulnerable" or "endangered" on the IUCN Red List of Threatened Species.

Background
The association of waxcaps with unimproved (nutrient-poor) grasslands was first noted in 1949 in the Netherlands, but current interest was stimulated by a series of papers published by Dutch mycologist Eef Arnolds in the 1980s. Arnolds not only confirmed the association of waxcaps with unimproved grasslands, but also noted the rapid decline in such habitats in the Netherlands. Similar studies were subsequently undertaken elsewhere in Europe, initially in Denmark and the United Kingdom.

Definition and description
Waxcap grasslands are characterized by being unimproved (unfertilized and nutrient-poor), short-sward (through grazing or mowing), moss-rich, and long-established (not recently sown). They occur in both upland and lowland areas and may be on acidic, neutral, or calcareous soil. They support a wide range of characteristic larger fungi, but may not be equally species-rich in plants.

Characteristic species
Larger fungi characteristic of waxcap grasslands include agarics (gilled mushrooms) belonging to the genera Cuphophyllus, Gliophorus, Gloioxanthomyces, Hygrocybe, Neohygrocybe, and Porpolomopsis (waxcaps), Entoloma (pinkgills), Dermoloma, Pseudotricholoma, Camarophyllopsis, and Hodophilus; clavarioid fungi (club and coral fungi) belonging to the genera Clavaria, Clavulinopsis, and Ramariopsis; and earthtongues belonging to the genera Geoglossum, Glutinoglossum, Microglossum, and Trichoglossum.

The "CHEG" or "CHEGD" assessment system
In 1995, Rald  proposed a simple count of the number of waxcap species present at a given site in order to assess its value as a waxcap grassland. He suggested that the presence of 17 or more species meant the site was of national importance, 9-16 species of regional importance, 4-8 species of local importance, and 3 or fewer of no importance. This system was modified by Rotheroe and others to include all the characteristic macrofungi and not just waxcaps.

Known as the "CHEG" system, this is widely used in survey work today. The acronym "CHEG" stands for the main groups of relevant fungi: C - the clavarioid species (club and coral fungi); H - species of Hygrocybe and related genera (waxcaps); E - Entoloma species (pinkgills); and G - the geoglossoid fungi (earthtongues). More recently the modified term "CHEGD" has been used to include species of Dermoloma, Pseudotricholoma, Camarophyllopsis, and Hodophilus which also inhabit these grasslands.

Conservation
The past 75 years have witnessed a loss of more than 90% of unimproved grasslands in western Europe, mainly due to agricultural intensification through ploughing and reseeding, manuring, and the application of fertilizers and other chemicals. The maintenance of a short sward by grazing or mowing (and removal or cuttings) has also been shown to be important for fruiting of waxcaps, with haycutting in July, followed by aftermath grazing/mowing to 3 cm having found to be optimal. In 1988, Arnolds estimated that only some 200 ha of unimproved waxcap grasslands remained in the Netherlands.
 
As a result, both the unimproved, nutrient-poor grasslands and the larger fungi typical of such grasslands are of conservation concern, with 23 waxcap-grassland species currently assessed as globally "vulnerable" or "endangered" on the IUCN Red List of Threatened Species.

Globally threatened waxcap-grassland fungi

Conservation in the United Kingdom

In the United Kingdom, survey work has shown that surviving waxcap grasslands are more extensive than in many other European countries, thanks mainly to large areas of unimproved upland sheep pastures and also to many unimproved lawns (especially in churchyards and country houses) and amenity grasslands. Nonetheless, five species characteristic of waxcap grasslands - Entoloma bloxamii, Porpolomopsis calyptriformis, Hygrocybe spadicea, Microglossum atropurpureum, and Microglossum olivaceum - were formerly the subject of national Biodiversity Action Plans and waxcap grasslands as a specific habitat were the subject of several local Biodiversity Action Plans. Four species - E. bloxamii, H. spadicea, M. atropurpureum, and M. olivaceum - are currently listed as "Priority Species" under Section 41 of the Natural Environment and Rural Communities Act (in England) and  Section 7 of the Environment (Wales) Act (in Wales).

JNCC (Joint Nature Conservation Committee) has issued "Guidelines for the Selection of Biological SSSIs" (Sites of Special Scientific Interest) that offer a measure of protection to waxcap grasslands. Using the "CHEGD" system, sites should be considered for notification as SSSIs if the total number of waxcap species reaches or exceeds 19. Thresholds are also stipulated for other CHEGD species. As a result, several waxcap-grassland sites, such as the banks of Llanishen and Lisvane Reservoirs in Cardiff Down Farm in Dorset, The Leasowes in Shropshire, and the lawns of Roecliffe Manor in Leicestershire, have been designated Sites of Special Scientific Interest,

Waxcap grassland surveys have been undertaken by the British Mycological Society, the National Trust, Plantlife, and the various national conservation bodies. A leaflet on managing waxcap grasslands in Britain and Ireland has been published by Plantlife and the Fungus Conservation Forum.

References

External links
WaxCap Website, University of Wales, Aberystwyth.

Grasslands
Fungus ecology
Habitats